Greatest Hits Volume III is a compilation album by American country music artist Conway Twitty. It was released in 1990 via MCA Records. The album also includes the single "Fit to Be Tied Down".

Track listing

Chart performance

References

1990 compilation albums
Conway Twitty albums
Albums produced by Jimmy Bowen
MCA Records compilation albums